Stefan Hagfeldt (born June 30, 1944) is a Swedish politician of the Moderate Party, member of the Riksdag 1998–2002, and then again 2003–2006.

References

Members of the Riksdag from the Moderate Party
Living people
1944 births
Members of the Riksdag 2002–2006
Place of birth missing (living people)
Members of the Riksdag 1998–2002